Swiftcurrent Lake is located in the Many Glacier region of Glacier National Park, in the U.S. state of Montana.  The Many Glacier Hotel, the largest hotel in the park, is along the east shore of the lake. Many hiking trails originate from the area and scenic tour boats provide access to the lake for visitors.

Nearby lakes include the much larger Lake Sherburne to the east and Lake Josephine to the immediate southwest. The fast disappearing Grinnell Glacier is one of several glaciers and snowfields that provide water for the streams that replenish the lake. Mount Gould, Grinnell Point and Mount Wilbur are the largest mountains immediately west of the lake.

See also
 
 List of lakes in Glacier County, Montana

References

Lakes of Glacier National Park (U.S.)
Lakes of Glacier County, Montana